The Bar of Quebec is the regulatory body for the practice of advocates in the Canadian province of Quebec and one of two legal regulatory bodies in the province. It was founded on May 30, 1849, as the Bar of Lower Canada.

History
The beginnings of the Quebec Bar go back to 1693 when, as a Royal Province of the French colonial empire, Canadien advocates first tried to obtain official recognition and were refused by Governor Louis de Buade de Frontenac, who upheld the 1678 edict by the Sovereign Council denying recognition of the legal profession in New France. At that time, legal advocacy was carried out largely at the local level by an elected syndic, who would normally have had some education if not in the legal profession specifically, the Provost of Quebec (equivalent to an attorney general) being the only person required to have obtained formal legal education and training during that period in Canada.

French Canadian advocates would not be recognized for nearly a century, by which time (after the Battle of the Plains of Abraham) they had become British colonial subjects. In 1765, Governor  James Murray of the new British Province of Quebec authorized the creation of the "Community of Lawyers" (Communauté des avocats), which granted commissions to its members allowing them to practise law as advocates, notaries and land surveyors. The precursor to the present-day Bar of Quebec, the Community of Lawyers, adopted the first-ever code of ethics and conduct.

The Bar of Quebec became an independent corporation in 1849 through the Act to incorporate the Bar of Lower Canada (11-12 Vict. [1849], c.46.) and was granted sole responsibility for admission to the study and practice of law.  The Act authorizing the incorporation of the Bar of Quebec was influential elsewhere and inspired the formation of similar corporations, such as the State Bar of California.

Admission
Admission to the Bar of Quebec is a prerequisite for practising law in Quebec.

Quebec applicants must be graduates of the law faculty of one of six universities:  the Université de Montréal, the Université du Québec à Montréal, McGill University, Laval University, the University of Ottawa, or the Université de Sherbrooke.  In addition, applicants must attend a four- or eight-month course at the École du Barreau (Bar School), and complete a six-month apprenticeship.  Finally, applicants must pass a character and fitness examination before the Comité de vérification du Barreau du Québec (Verification Committee of the Bar of Quebec).  Practising attorneys must complete 30 hours of continuing legal education every two years.

Lawyers from other Canadian provinces and foreign lawyers can be temporarily admitted (for not more than twelve months) by submitting an "Application for a Special Authorization for a Person Practising Outside Québec."  They can also obtain semi-permanent or permanent full admission on application.  Full admission for lawyers from elsewhere in Canada requires, among other things, that the applicant demonstrate adequate proficiency in French and successfully complete examinations on civil law and legislation.  Foreign applicants may be admitted only by obtaining an undergraduate degree from a Quebec law school or by approval of the Bar of Quebec's Equivalences Committee, which may impose applicant-specific conditions for admission.

See also
Bar of Montreal
Chamber of Notaries of Quebec
Quebec law

References

External links
Official website

Quebec
Legal organizations based in Quebec

1849 establishments in Canada
Organizations established in 1849